The Joseph Ayo Babalola University (JABU) is a private Nigerian university located in Ikeji-Arakeji, Osun State, Nigeria, established in 2004 by the Christ Apostolic Church (CAC) Worldwide. The university is named after the first spiritual leader of the Christ Apostolic Church, Joseph Ayo Babalola (1904–1959); it is located at the place where the Apostle was called  by God to slay the Ogobungo ogre in 1928. Joseph Ayo Babalola University is a fully residential institution. The university offers courses in the following colleges; Agricultural Sciences, Environmental Sciences, Humanities, Law, Management Sciences, Natural Sciences, Social Sciences, and Health Sciences. Due to the school's Christian foundations, male and female students are enjoined to adopt an extremely modest mode of dressing while on campus. It was the first entrepreneurial university in Nigeria. The first Chancellor of the University was His Royal Majesty, Oba (Dr) Oladele Olashore (CON).

Additionally, it offers housing for its students as well as other facilities, including a library and high-quality college buildings.

References

External links

2004 establishments in Nigeria
Christian universities and colleges in Nigeria
Educational institutions established in 2004
Osun State